This is a list of the past and present mayors and city managers of Brockton, Massachusetts.

Mayors

City managers
From 1958 to 1961, Brockton was led by a City Manager under the Plan D form of government.

References

Brockton